Letizia Camera (born  in Acqui Terme) is an Italian professional female volleyball player who plays as a setter. As part of the Italy women's national volleyball team she participated in international tournaments such as the FIVB World Grand Prix (in 2012, 2013 and 2015), the 2013 European Championship, the 2015 Montreux Masters and the 2015 European Games.

At club level she played for teams in Italy (Asystel Volley, Imoco Volley, Volleyball Casalmaggiore, Futura Volley Busto Arsizio) and France (RC Cannes, Saint-Raphaël Var VB).

Clubs
  Asystel Volley Novara (2007–2012)
  Imoco Volley Conegliano (2012–2013)
  Pomì Casalmaggiore (2013–2014)
  Unendo Yamamay Busto Arsizio (2014–2015)
  RC Cannes (2015–2016)
  Saint-Raphaël Var VB (2016–present)

Awards

Club
 2008–09 CEV Cup —  Gold medal (with Asystel Novara)
 2008–09 Italian Cup —  Silver medal (with Asystel Novara)
 2008–09 Italian Championship —  Silver medal (with Asystel Novara)
 2008–09 Italian Championship —  Silver medal (with Imoco Volley Conegliano)
 2014–15 CEV Champions League —  Silver medal (with Unendo Yamamay Busto Arsizio)
 2015–16 French Cup —  Gold medal (with RC Cannes)
 2015–16 French Championship —  Silver medal (with RC Cannes)

References

External links

 Profile at CEV
 Profile  at legavolleyfemminile.it
 Profile  at lnv.fr

1992 births
Living people
People from Acqui Terme
Sportspeople from the Province of Alessandria
Italian women's volleyball players
Volleyball players at the 2015 European Games
European Games competitors for Italy
Serie A1 (women's volleyball) players
Italian expatriate sportspeople in France